Cremnoconchus is a genus of small freshwater snails, gastropod mollusks in the (mostly marine) family Littorinidae, the winkles or periwinkles.

The generic name Cremnoconchus is from the Greek word κρημνός which means precipice and from the Ancient Greek word κόγχος which means shell.

This genus is the only freshwater genus within the Littorinidae; all other Littorinidae are marine. Two Cremnoconchus species live  in waterfalls.

The genus Cremnoconchus is endemic to the Northwestern Ghats of India.

Species
There were recognized 2-3 species by Strong et al. in 2008, but Reid et al. described 6 new species of Cremnoconchus in 2013.

Species within the genus Cremnoconchus include:
 Cremnoconchus agumbensis Reid, Aravind & Madhyastha, 2013
 Cremnoconchus canaliculatus W. T. Blanford, 1870 - synonym: Cremnoconchus fairbanki Hanley & Theobald, 1876
 Cremnoconchus castanea Reid, Aravind & Madhyastha, 2013
 Cremnoconchus cingulatus Reid, Aravind & Madhyastha, 2013
 Cremnoconchus conicus Blanford, 1870 - synonym: Cremnoconchus carinatus (Layard, 1854)
 Cremnoconchus dwarakii Reid, Aravind & Madhyastha, 2013
 Cremnoconchus globulus Reid, Aravind & Madhyastha, 2013
 Cremnoconchus hanumani Reid, Aravind & Madhyastha, 2013
 Cremnoconchus syhadrensis (Blanford, 1863) - type species

Synonyms
 Cremnochonchus messageri Bavay & Dautzenberg, 1900 is a synonym for Paludomus messageri (Bavay & Dautzenberg, 1900)

References

External links

Littorinidae